A League of Nations mandate was a legal status for certain territories transferred from the control of one country to another following World War I, or the legal instruments that contained the internationally agreed-upon terms for administering the territory on behalf of the League of Nations. These were of the nature of both a treaty and a constitution, which contained minority rights clauses that provided for the rights of petition and adjudication by the Permanent Court of International Justice.

The mandate system was established under Article 22 of the Covenant of the League of Nations, entered into force on 28 June 1919. With the dissolution of the League of Nations after World War II, it was stipulated at the Yalta Conference that the remaining Mandates should be placed under the trusteeship of the United Nations, subject to future discussions and formal agreements. Most of the remaining mandates of the League of Nations (with the exception of South-West Africa) thus eventually became United Nations Trust Territories.

Two governing principles formed the core of the Mandate System, being non-annexation of the territory and its administration as a "sacred trust of civilisation" to develop the territory for the benefit of its native people.

According to historian Susan Pedersen, colonial administration in the mandates did not differ substantially from colonial administration elsewhere. Even though the Covenant of the League committed the great powers to govern the mandates differently, the main difference appeared to be that the colonial powers spoke differently about the mandates than their other colonial possessions.

Basis
The mandate system was established by Article 22 of the Covenant of the League of Nations, drafted by the victors of World War I. The article referred to territories which after the war were no longer ruled by their previous sovereign, but their peoples were not considered "able to stand by themselves under the strenuous conditions of the modern world". The article called for such people's tutelage to be "entrusted to advanced nations who by reason of their resources, their experience or their geographical position can best undertake this responsibility".

U.S. President Woodrow Wilson and South African General Jan Smuts played influential roles in pushing for the establishment of a mandates system. The mandates system reflected a compromise between Smuts (who wanted colonial powers to annex the territories) and Wilson (who wanted trusteeship over the territories).

Generalities
All of the territories subject to League of Nations mandates were previously controlled by states defeated in World War I, principally Imperial Germany and the Ottoman Empire. The mandates were fundamentally different from the protectorates in that the Mandatory power undertook obligations to the inhabitants of the territory and to the League of Nations.

The process of establishing the mandates consisted of two phases:
The formal removal of sovereignty of the state previously controlling the territory.
The transfer of mandatory powers to individual states among the Allied Powers.

Treaties
The divestiture of Germany's overseas colonies, along with three territories disentangled from its European homeland area (the Free City of Danzig, Memel Territory, and Saar), was accomplished in the Treaty of Versailles (1919), with the territories being allotted among the Allies on 7 May of that year.  Ottoman territorial claims were first addressed in the Treaty of Sèvres (1920) and finalised in the Treaty of Lausanne (1923).  The Turkish territories were allotted among the Allied Powers at the San Remo conference in 1920.

Types of mandates

The League of Nations decided the exact level of control by the Mandatory power over each mandate on an individual basis. However, in every case the Mandatory power was forbidden to construct fortifications or raise an army within the territory of the mandate, and was required to present an annual report on the territory to the Permanent Mandates Commission of the League of Nations.

The mandates were divided into three distinct groups based upon the level of development each population had achieved at that time.

The first group, or Class A mandates, were territories formerly controlled by the Ottoman Empire that were deemed to "... have reached a stage of development where their existence as independent nations can be provisionally recognized subject to the rendering of administrative advice and assistance by a Mandatory until such time as they are able to stand alone. The wishes of these communities must be a principal consideration in the selection of the Mandatory."

The mandatory power was forbidden to construct military or naval bases within the mandates.

The Class C mandates, including South West Africa and certain of the South Pacific Islands, were considered to be "best administered under the laws of the Mandatory as integral portions of its territory"

List of mandates
Column header abbreviations: C = Class, sov. = sovereignty

Rules of establishment

According to the Council of the League of Nations, meeting of August 1920: "draft mandates adopted by the Allied and Associated Powers would not be definitive until they had been considered and approved by the League ... the legal title held by the mandatory Power must be a double one: one conferred by the Principal Powers and the other conferred by the League of Nations,"

Three steps were required to establish a Mandate under international law:
(1) The Principal Allied and Associated Powers confer a mandate on one of their number or on a third power; (2) the principal powers officially notify the council of the League of Nations that a certain power has been appointed mandatory for such a certain defined territory; and (3) the council of the League of Nations takes official cognisance of the appointment of the mandatory power and informs the latter that it [the council] considers it as invested with the mandate, and at the same time notifies it of the terms of the mandate, after ascertaining whether they are in conformance with the provisions of the covenant."

The U.S. State Department Digest of International Law says that the terms of the Treaty of Lausanne provided for the application of the principles of state succession to the "A" Mandates. The Treaty of Versailles (1920) provisionally recognised the former Ottoman communities as independent nations. It also required Germany to recognise the disposition of the former Ottoman territories and to recognise the new states laid down within their boundaries. The terms of the Treaty of Lausanne (1923) required the newly created states that acquired the territory detached from the Ottoman Empire to pay annuities on the Ottoman public debt and to assume responsibility for the administration of concessions that had been granted by the Ottomans. The treaty also let the States acquire, without payment, all the property and possessions of the Ottoman Empire situated within their territory. The treaty provided that the League of Nations was responsible for establishing an arbitral court to resolve disputes that might arise and stipulated that its decisions were final.

A disagreement regarding the legal status and the portion of the annuities to be paid by the "A" mandates was settled when an Arbitrator ruled that some of the mandates contained more than one State:The difficulty arises here how one is to regard the Asiatic countries under the British and French mandates. Iraq is a Kingdom in regard to which Great Britain has undertaken responsibilities equivalent to those of a Mandatory Power. Under the British mandate, Palestine and Transjordan have each an entirely separate organization. We are, therefore, in the presence of three States sufficiently separate to be considered as distinct Parties. France has received a single mandate from the Council of the League of Nations, but in the countries subject to that mandate, one can distinguish two distinct States: Syria and the Lebanon, each State possessing its own constitution and a nationality clearly different from the other.

Later history
After the United Nations was founded in 1945 and the League of Nations was disbanded, all but one of the mandated territories that remained under the control of the mandatory power became United Nations trust territories, a roughly equivalent status. In each case, the colonial power that held the mandate on each territory became the administering power of the trusteeship, except that Japan, which had been defeated in World War II, lost its mandate over the South Pacific islands, which became a "strategic trust territory" known as the Trust Territory of the Pacific Islands under United States administration.

The sole exception to the transformation of the League of Nations mandates into UN trusteeships was that South Africa refused to place South-West Africa under trusteeship. Instead, South Africa proposed that it be allowed to annex South-West Africa, a proposal rejected by the United Nations General Assembly. The International Court of Justice held that South Africa continued to have international obligations under the mandate for South-West Africa. The territory finally attained independence in 1990 as Namibia, after a long guerrilla war of independence against the apartheid regime.

Nearly all the former League of Nations mandates had become sovereign states by 1990, including all of the former United Nations Trust Territories with the exception of a few successor entities of the gradually dismembered Trust Territory of the Pacific Islands (formerly Japan's South Pacific Trust Mandate). These exceptions include the Northern Mariana Islands which is a commonwealth in political union with the United States with the status of unincorporated organised territory. The Northern Mariana Islands does elect its own governor to serve as territorial head of government, but it remains a U.S. territory with its head of state being the President of the United States and federal funds to the Commonwealth administered by the Office of Insular Affairs of the United States Department of the Interior.

Remnant Micronesia and the Marshall Islands, the heirs of the last territories of the Trust, attained final independence on 22 December 1990. (The UN Security Council ratified termination of trusteeship, effectively dissolving trusteeship status, on 10 July 1987.) The Republic of Palau, split off from the Federated States of Micronesia, became the last to effectively get its independence, on 1 October 1994.

See also 
 United Nations trust territories

Sources and references 
 Anghie, Antony "Colonialism and the Birth of International Institutions: Sovereignty, Economy, and the Mandate System of the League of Nations" 34 (3) New York University Journal of International Law and Politics 513 (2002)
 
 Nele Matz, Civilization and the Mandate System under the League of Nations as Origin of Trusteeship, in: A. von Bogdandy and R. Wolfrum, (eds.), Max Planck Yearbook of United Nations Law, Volume 9, 2005, p. 47–95. 
 Pugh, Jeffrey, "Whose Brother's Keeper? International Trusteeship and the Search for Peace in the Palestinian Territories", International Studies Perspectives 13, no. 4 (November 2012): 321–343. 
 Tamburini, Francesco "I mandati della Società delle Nazioni", in Africana, Rivista di Studi Extraeuropei, n.XV – 2009, pp. 99–122.

Further reading 
 Bruce, Scot David, Woodrow Wilson's Colonial Emissary: Edward M. House and the Origins of the Mandate System, 1917–1919 (University of Nebraska Press, 2013).
 Callahan, Michael D. Mandates and empire: the League of Nations and Africa, 1914–1931 (Brighton: Sussex Academic Press, 1999)
 Haas, Ernst B. "The reconciliation of conflicting colonial policy aims: acceptance of the League of Nations mandate system," International Organization (1952) 6#4 pp: 521–536.
 Margalith, Aaron M. The International Mandates (1930) online 
 Mazower, Mark. 2013. No Enchanted Palace: The End of Empire and the Ideological Origins of the United Nations. Princeton University Press.
 Pedersen, Susan. The Guardians: the League of Nations and the Crisis of Empire, (New York: Oxford University Press, 2015)
 Sluglett, Peter. "An improvement on colonialism? The 'A' mandates and their legacy in the Middle East," International Affairs (2014) 90#2 pp. 413–427. On the former Arab provinces of the Ottoman Empire

References

 *
1946 disestablishments
20th century in Japan
Decolonization
French colonial empire
Governance of the British Empire